Baksho Rahashya may refer to:
 Baksho Rahashya (novel), a 1972 novel by Satyajit Ray
 Baksho Rahashya (film), a 1996 Telefilm and 2001 film directed by Sandip Ray, based on the novel